Hierodoris frigida is a moth of the family Oecophoridae. It is endemic to New Zealand and is only found in the South Island. This species is found in two parts of that island, the Nelson/Tasman area and the Mackenzie, Otago and Dunedin areas in the southern part of the island. Although similar to H. iophanes this species can be distinguished as H. frigida has white bands on its forewings and the metallic coloured areas differ in placement. Segment 2 on the labial palp is entirely yellow and enables this species to be distinguished from the similar appearing species H. polita and H. torrida. Larvae have been collected amongst leaf litter from beneath species within the genus Thymus. It prefers open and shrubland habitats and adult moths have been observed flying close to the soil underneath Leptospermum scrub.

Taxonomy 

This species was described by Alfred Philpott in 1923 using specimens collected by Philpott in January on Dun Mountain in Nelson at around 3000 ft. In 1988 J. S. Dugdale synonymised Taoscelis crocostoma with H. frigida. This synonym was confirmed by Robert Hoare in 2005. The male holotype specimen of H. frigida is held in the New Zealand Arthropod Collection.

Description

Philpott described this species as follows:
Although similar to H. iophanes this species can be distinguished as H. frigida has white bands on its forewings and the metallic coloured areas differ in placement. Segment 2 on the labial palp is entirely yellow and ensures that this species can be distinguished from the similar appearing species H. polita and H. torrida.

Distribution 
This species is endemic to New Zealand and is found only in the South Island. It appears to have populations in two areas, the first being the Nelson/Tasman districts, and the second being south Canterbury south including the Mackenzie, central Otago and Dunedin areas.

Behaviour 
This species is on the wing during the day and has been observed flying close to the soil underneath Leptospermum scrub.

Hosts and habitats 
The larvae have been collected amongst leaf litter from beneath invasive species within the genus Thymus. This species prefers open and shrubland habitats. It is also present at the Conroys Road Inland Saline Wetland Complex.

References 

Moths described in 1923
Moths of New Zealand
Oecophoridae
Endemic fauna of New Zealand
Taxa named by Alfred Philpott
Endemic moths of New Zealand